Sabina Glasovac (born 20 May 1978 in Našice) is a Croatian politician from the SDP who currently serves as a Deputy Speaker of the Croatian Parliament.

References

See also 

 List of members of Croatian Parliament, 2020–

Living people
1978 births
Social Democratic Party of Croatia politicians
21st-century Croatian politicians
21st-century Croatian women politicians

Representatives in the modern Croatian Parliament
University of Split alumni